Louis Kaufmann Anspacher (March 1, 1878 in Cincinnati, Ohio – May 10, 1947 in Nashville, Tennessee) was an American poet, playwright and script writer.

He was the author of Challenge of the Unknown: Exploring the Psychic World, with an introduction by Waldemar Kaempffert, which was published by Allen and Unwin, in the USA in 1947 by Current Books, and in Great Britain in 1952 by Henderson and Spalding.

Anspacher's poem "Ocean Ode" served as the basis of a tone poem, The Ocean, by Henry Kimball Hadley, composed between 1920 and 1921.

Plays
The Embarrassment of Riches (1906)
A Woman of Impulse (1909)
Our Children (1915)
The Unchastened Woman (1915) (*filmed in 1918 and 1925)
That Day (1922)
Dagmar (1923)
The Rhapsody (193)

References

External links
 
 
portrait of Anspacher(New York Public Library, Billy Rose collection)

1878 births
1947 deaths
American male poets
American male dramatists and playwrights
American male screenwriters
20th-century American poets
20th-century American dramatists and playwrights
Writers from Cincinnati
Poets from Ohio
20th-century American male writers
Screenwriters from Ohio
20th-century American screenwriters